Stop at Nothing may refer to:
 Stop at Nothing (album), a 2003 album by Dying Fetus
 Stop at Nothing (1924 film), an American silent drama film
 Stop at Nothing (1991 film), a television film